The Nette is a small river in North Rhine-Westphalia, Germany, a left tributary of the Niers. It rises near Dülken, a borough of Viersen. The Nette flows through Viersen-Boisheim and Nettetal before reaching the Niers in Wachtendonk.

Lakes 

The Nette passes nine lakes on its way to Wachtendonk 
 Kleiner Breyeller See c. 5.3 ha
 Großer Breyeller See c. 9.2 ha
 Nettebruch c. 13.2 ha
 Windmühlenbruch c. 6 ha
 Ferkensbruch c. 4.5 ha
 Kleiner de Wittsee c. 4.5 ha
 Großer de Wittsee c. 22.5 ha
 Schrolik c. 15.5 ha
 Poelvennsee c. 24.5 ha

The Maas-Schwalm-Nette Nature Park is named after the river.

References

Rivers of North Rhine-Westphalia
Rivers of Germany